The Izvorul Muntelui is a right tributary of the river Bistrița in Romania. It discharges into the Bistrița downstream from the Izvorul Muntelui dam.

References

Rivers of Romania
Rivers of Neamț County